Anne Hald Jensen (born 2 March 1990) is a Danish badminton player. She represented Greece in 2010–2011. In 2009, she won the gold medals at the European Junior Championships in the girls' singles and mixed team events.

Achievements

European Junior Championships 
Girls' singles

BWF International Challenge/Series (10 titles, 9 runners-up) 
Women's singles

Women's doubles

Mixed doubles

  BWF International Challenge tournament
  BWF International Series tournament
  BWF Future Series tournament

References

External links 
 

1990 births
Living people
People from Sønderborg Municipality
Danish female badminton players
Greek female badminton players
Sportspeople from the Region of Southern Denmark